The 2006 Yale Bulldogs football team represented Yale University in the 2006 NCAA Division I FCS football season.  The Bulldogs were led by tenth-year head coach Jack Siedlecki, played their home games at the Yale Bowl and finished tied for first place in the Ivy League with a 6–1 record, 8–2 overall.

Schedule

References

Yale
Yale Bulldogs football seasons
Ivy League football champion seasons
Yale Bulldogs football